Duygu Özaslan Mutaf (born Duygu Özaslan,  17 April 1991) is a Turkish beauty YouTuber and Internet celebrity. Özaslan is a dropout of Istanbul University  faculty of Spanish Language and Literature. She generally publishes makeup videos but her over time her style of content has diversified to include vlogs and videos on lifestyle.

Reception 
In a 2017 study, it was reported that the followers of Duygu Özaslan consisted of three main groups: "fans", "haters" and "righteous ones". In a study conducted with 242 people in 2018, it was found that Duygu Özaslan is the most followed beauty vlogger after Danla Bilic and Çağla Şıkel. 12.4% of the participants stated that they followed Duygu Özaslan. As of July 2020, Özaslan has more than 1.45 million subscribers on YouTube.

In a study related to product placement studies on YouTube channels, the videos that Özaslan uploaded on her YouTube channel between 1 June 2017 and 20 February 2018 were analyzed and it was found that the viewers were interested in Duygu Özaslan and the shooting quality of the video rather than advertisement.

Criticism 
Duygu Özaslan's description of fried egg as "sunny side up" rather than "sahanda yumurta", which is the phrase's equivalent in Turkish, caused a backlash by Turkish users on the Internet.

Özaslan received further criticism by social media users in July 2020, after photographs taken of her in a bikini by the paparazzi and shown in the press turned out to be different from those she had published on her Instagram account. Özaslan explained that she had bulimia nervosa, which had affected her eating habits and weight, and added that she was in the treatment phase.

References

External links
 
 Duygu Özaslan on YouTube

1991 births
Living people
Turkish YouTubers